The Broomend of Crichie Stone is a class I Pictish stone that stands within a henge at Broomend of Crichie, Port Elphinstone, Inverurie, Aberdeenshire, Scotland. It was placed within the henge in the 19th century. The stone bears the incised symbols of the Pictish beast and the crescent and V-rod.

The henge, with the avenue, standing stones and the symbol stone, is a scheduled monument.

References

Pictish stones
Pictish stones in Aberdeenshire
Scheduled Ancient Monuments in Aberdeenshire
Inverurie